Palm vinegar or sugar palm vinegar refers to vinegar made from palm or sugar palm sap:

Coconut vinegar, predominantly from the Philippines made from coconut water and coconut sap
Nipa palm vinegar, from the Philippines made from Nypa fruticans sap
Kaong palm vinegar, from the Philippines made from Arenga pinnata sap